The Mexica were a pre-Hispanic people of central Mexico.

Mexica may also refer to:
Mexica (board game), a board game designed by Wolfgang Kramer and Michael Kiesling
Mexica (book), a 2005 novel by Norman Spinrad

See also
Mexico (disambiguation)
Mexican (disambiguation)